Below is the list of populated places in Ardahan Province, Turkey by districts. In the following lists, first place in each list is the administrative center of the district.

Ardahan 

Ardahan
Açıkyazı, Ardahan
Ağzıpek, Ardahan
Akyaka, Ardahan
Alagöz, Ardahan
Altaş, Ardahan
Ardıçdere, Ardahan
Aşağıkurtoğlu, Ardahan
Bağdaşen, Ardahan
Balıkçılar, Ardahan
Bayramoğlu, Ardahan
Beşiktaş, Ardahan
Binbaşar, Ardahan
Büyüksütlüce, Ardahan
Çağlayık, Ardahan
Çalabaş, Ardahan
Çamlıçatak, Ardahan
Çataldere, Ardahan
Çatalköprü, Ardahan
Çeğilli, Ardahan
Çetinsu, Ardahan
Çimenkaya, Ardahan
Çobanlı, Ardahan
Dağcı, Ardahan
Dağevi, Ardahan
Dedegül, Ardahan
Değirmenli, Ardahan
Derindere, Ardahan
Edegül, Ardahan
Gölgeli, Ardahan
Gürçayır, Ardahan
Güzçimeni, Ardahan
Güzelyurt, Ardahan
Hacıali, Ardahan
Hasköy, Ardahan
Höçvan, Ardahan
Kartalpınar, Ardahan
Kazlıköy, Ardahan
Kıraç, Ardahan
Kocaköy, Ardahan
Köprücük, Ardahan
Küçüksütlüce, Ardahan
Lehimli, Ardahan
Meşedibi, Ardahan
Nebioğlu, Ardahan
Ortageçit, Ardahan
Otbiçen, Ardahan
Ovapınar, Ardahan
Ölçek, Ardahan
Ömerağa, Ardahan
Samanbeyli, Ardahan
Sarıyamaç, Ardahan
Sugöze, Ardahan
Sulakyurt, Ardahan
Taşlıdere, Ardahan
Tazeköy, Ardahan
Tepeler, Ardahan
Tepesuyu, Ardahan
Tunçoluk, Ardahan
Uzunova, Ardahan
Yanlızçam, Ardahan
Yaylacık, Ardahan
Yokuşdibi, Ardahan
Yukarıkurtoğlu, Ardahan

Çıldır 

Çıldır
Ağıllı, Çıldır
Akçakale, Çıldır
Akçıl, Çıldır
Akdarı, Çıldır
Akkiraz, Çıldır
Aşağıcambaz, Çıldır
Aşıkşenlik, Çıldır
Baltalı, Çıldır
Başköy, Çıldır
Damlıca, Çıldır
Dirsekkaya, Çıldır
Doğankaya, Çıldır
Eskibeyrehatun, Çıldır
Eşmepınar, Çıldır
Gölbelen, Çıldır
Gölebakan, Çıldır
Güvenocak, Çıldır
Karakale, Çıldır
Kaşlıkaya, Çıldır
Kayabeyi, Çıldır
Kenarbel, Çıldır
Kenardere, Çıldır
Kotanlı, Çıldır
Kurtkale, Çıldır
Kuzukaya, Çıldır
Meryemköy, Çıldır
Öncül, Çıldır
Övündü, Çıldır
Sabaholdu, Çıldır
Saymalı, Çıldır
Sazlısu, Çıldır
Semihaşakir, Çıldır
Taşdeğirmen, Çıldır
Yenibeyrehatun, Çıldır
Yıldırımtepe, Çıldır
Yukarıcambaz, Çıldır

Damal

Damal
Burmadere, Damal
Dereköy, Damal
Eskikılıç, Damal
İkizdere, Damal
Otağlı, Damal
Seyitören, Damal
Tepeköy, Damal

Göle

Göle
Arpaşen, Göle
Balçeşme, Göle
Bellitepe, Göle
Budaklı, Göle
Büyükaltınbulak, Göle
Çakıldere, Göle
Çakırüzüm, Göle
Çalıdere, Göle
Çardaklı, Göle
Çayırbaşı, Göle
Çobanköy, Göle
Çullu, Göle
Damlasu, Göle
Dedekılıcı, Göle
Dengeli, Göle
Dereyolu, Göle
Dölekçayır, Göle
Durucasu, Göle
Esenboğaz, Göle
Esenyayla, Göle
Eskidemirkapı, Göle
Filizli, Göle
Gedik, Göle
Gülistan, Göle
Günorta
Hoşdülbent, Göle
Kalecik, Göle
Karlıyazı, Göle
Kayaaltı, Göle
Koyunlu, Göle
Köprülü, Göle
Kuytuca, Göle
Kuzupınarı, Göle
Küçükaltınbulak, Göle
Mollahasan, Göle
Okçu, Göle
Samandöken, Göle
Senemoğlu, Göle
Serinçayır, Göle
Sürügüden, Göle
Tahtakıran, Göle
Tellioğlu, Göle
Toptaş, Göle *Uğurtaşı, Göle
Yağmuroğlu, Göle
Yanatlı, Göle
Yavuzlar, Göle *Yeleçli, Göle
Yenidemirkapı, Göle
Yeniköy, Göle
Yiğitkonağı, Göle

Hanak 

Hanak
Altınemek, Hanak
Aşağıaydere, Hanak
Baştoklu, Hanak
Binbaşak, Hanak
Börk, Hanak
Çatköy, Hanak
Çavdarlı, Hanak
Çayağzı, Hanak
Çiçeklidağ, Hanak
Çimliçayır, Hanak
Güneşgören, Hanak
İncedere , Hanak
Karakale, Hanak
Koyunpınarı, Hanak
Sazlıçayır, Hanak
Serinkuyu, Hanak
Sevimli, Hanak
Sulakçayır, Hanak
Yamaçyolu, Hanak
Yamçılı, Hanak
Yukarıaydere, Hanak
Yünbüken, Hanak

Posof 

Posof
Akballı, Posof
Alabalık, Posof
Alköy, Posof
Arılı, Posof
Armutveren, Posof
Asmakonak, Posof
Aşıküzeyir, Posof
Aşıkzülali, Posof
Balgözü, Posof
Baykent, Posof
Binbaşıeminbey, Posof
Çakırkoç, Posof
Çambeli, Posof
Çamyazı, Posof
Çayırçimen, Posof
Demirdöver, Posof
Derindere, Posof
Doğrular, Posof
Erim, Posof
Gönülaçan, Posof
Gümüşkavak, Posof
Günbatan, Posof
Günlüce, Posof
Gürarmut, Posof
İncedere, Posof
Kaleönü, Posof
Kalkankaya, Posof
Kayınlı, Posof
Kırköy, Posof
Kolköy, Posof
Kopuzlu, Posof
Kumlukoz, Posof
Kurşunçavuş, Posof
Özbaşı, Posof
Sarıçiçek, Posof
Sarıdarı, Posof
Savaşır, Posof
Söğütlükaya, Posof
Süngülü, Posof
Sütoluk, Posof
Taşkıran, Posof
Türgözü, Posof
Uğurca, Posof
Uluçam, Posof
Yaylaaltı, Posof
Yeniköy, Posof
Yolağzı, Posof
Yurtbaşı, Posof
Yurtbekler, Posof

References

Ardahan Province
Ardahan
List